Oktavianus is an Indonesian footballer who is currently playing for Persija Jakarta in the Indonesian Super League. His natural position is left midfielder and he is 165 cm tall.

Honours

Club honors
Sriwijaya
Liga Indonesia (1): 2007–08
Piala Indonesia (3): 2007–08, 2008–09, 2010

References

External links
Match Review Persib vs Sriwijaya FC - 17 April 2009
Sriwijaya FC Diterkam "Maung Bandung"
Biodata Oktavianus
Oktavianus at Soccerway

Living people
Indonesian footballers
1981 births
Association football wingers
Sriwijaya F.C. players
Persija Jakarta players
People from Padang
Sportspeople from West Sumatra